Al-Sultana Raadhafathi Sri Suvama Abaarana Mahaa Rehendhi was the Sultana regnant of the Maldives in 1380-1383.

She was the third daughter of Sultan Omar I of the Maldives and ascended the throne of the Maldives after the death of her sister, Rehendhi Khadijah. After reigning for a short time, she gave the throne to her husband, Mohamed of Maakurath.

References
 Mernissi, Fatima; Mary Jo Lakeland (2003). The forgotten queens of Islam. Oxford University Press. .

External links 
WOMEN IN POWER 1350-1400

14th-century sultans of the Maldives
14th-century women rulers
1383 deaths
Queens regnant in Asia
Maldivian women in politics
Islam and women